Ghadames or Ghadamis (Arabic: غدامس, Libyan vernacular: ġdāməs) was a  district of Libya until 2007.  Its territory is now part of Nalut District.  It was in the northwest of the country with its capital at Ghadames.

To the west, Ghadamis bordered the following regions of Tunisia and Algeria:
Tataouine Governorate, Tunisia - north
Ouargla Province, Algeria - northwest
Illizi Province, Algeria - west
Domestically, it bordered the following districts:
Nalut - northeast
Mizda - east
Wadi Al Shatii - south

 

Former districts of Libya